Ann-Lou Jørgensen (born 12 June 1977) is a badminton player from Denmark.

Career
Jørgensen competed in badminton at the 2004 Summer Olympics in women's doubles with partner Rikke Olsen.  They had a bye in the first round and defeated Nicole Grether and Juliane Schenk of Germany in the second.  In the quarterfinals, Jørgensen and Olsen lost to Huang Sui and Gao Ling of China 15–6, 15–7.

External links
 Ann-Lou JORGENSEN at InternationalBadminton.org
 

1977 births
Living people
Danish female badminton players
Olympic badminton players of Denmark
Badminton players at the 2004 Summer Olympics
Sportspeople from the Central Denmark Region
21st-century Danish women